Ślubów may refer to the following places in Poland:
Ślubów, Lower Silesian Voivodeship (south-west Poland)
Ślubów, Masovian Voivodeship (east-central Poland)